Janata Dal, which was formed through the merger of Janata Party factions, the Lok Dal, Indian National Congress (Jagjivan) and the Jan Morcha under the leadership of V. P. Singh on 11 October 1988 on the birth anniversary of Jayaprakash Narayan.

By 1996 Indian general election Janata Dal gradually disintegrated into various smaller factions, largely regional parties Biju Janata Dal, Rashtriya Janata Dal, Janata Dal (Secular) and Janata Dal (United).

Some of the breakaway organisations have thrived as independent parties, some have become defunct, while others have merged with the parent party or other political parties.

List of breakaway parties

References

Janata Dal
Janata Parivar
Political schisms
India politics-related lists